Shosha is a novel by Nobel Prize winning author Isaac Bashevis Singer.  The original Yiddish version appeared in 1974 in the Jewish Daily Forward under the title Soul Expeditions.

Plot summary
The main character is aspiring author Aaron Greidinger who lives in the Hasidic quarter of the Jewish neighborhood of Warsaw during the 1930s.

"I was an anachronism in every way, but I didn't know it, just as I didn't know that my friendship with Shosha [..] had anything to do with love."

Aaron had many love affairs with women, but the only woman he truly loved was Shosha, his childhood friend. Shosha was struck by a sleeping disease and had since barely grown physically and was mentally retarded. Aaron lived his childhood on 10 Krochmalna Street, and lost the sight of her as he moved away and she moved from no. 10 to no. 7.

Hitler is in power in Germany and is set to annihilate the Jews in Poland while in Russia, Stalin rules with his deadly terror, so the only voluntary exit that many of the characters in Shosha perceive for themselves is suicide. Although Aaron is offered the opportunity to leave the threat of death — as others, from Hassidics to Hedonists, do — he turns down the chance to escape, for his love for Shosha and chooses to stay in Poland. Death is the cloud that hangs over the characters in Shosha. As writer whose main medium is language, the book opens by explaining that Aaron was brought up on three dead languages: Hebrew, Aramaic and Yiddish.

Epilogue
The epilogue of Shosha is an abrupt fast-forward from before the outbreak of the Second World War in Poland to the early fifties. It takes place thirteen years after the last chapter, when Aaron meets Haiml Chentshiner in Israel. The epilogue is a concise dialogue in which each recounts the death of their friends.

Characters
 Tsutsik, Aaron Greidinger‘s  nickname. Literally it means a little yapping puppy. In Yiddish this word, as well as some other words normally considered pejorative may be turned into endearments. 
 Shosha Schuldiener, daughter of the neighbors Bashele and Zelig.
 Teibele, Shosha's sister.
 Dora Stolnitz, Aaron's main lover at the beginning, who supposedly left Poland for Russia, only to be found still in Poland later in the book. 
 Moishe, Aaron's brother and rabbi.
 Betty Slonim, American actress who is the mistress of Sam Dreimann an American millionaire, her sugar-daddy; she also sleeps with Aaron.
 Sam Dreimann, an American millionaire, totally blinded by love for Betty. 
 Morris Feitelzohn, friend and hedonist philosopher.  A dilettante who is enslaved by his determination to be free.
 Haiml, husband of Celia; an immature, overgrown child and unsatisfying lover.
 Celia Chentshiner, wife of a friend and adulterous lover of Aaron and Feitelzohn.  She is physically dissatisfied by her husband and has an overactive libido.  She is a purported atheist who still dresses modestly with long sleeves and high collars, that betray her Hassidic upbringing.
 Tekla, Polish maid at Aaron's apartment.

References

 Sex, Torah, Revolution Book review by Alan Lelchuk in The New York Times of July 23, 1978

1978 American novels
Hasidic Judaism in fiction
Novels about writers
Novels by Isaac Bashevis Singer
Novels set in Warsaw
Fiction set in the 1930s
Novels set in Poland